In philately, a perfin is a stamp that has had initials or a name perforated across it to discourage theft. The name is a contraction of perforated initials or perforated insignia. They are also sometimes called SPIFS (Stamps Perforated with Initials of Firms and Societies).

History 
Great Britain was the first country to use perfins, beginning in 1868.  The practice spread quickly to Belgium (1872); Denmark, France, Germany and Switzerland (1876); and Austria (1877); the U.S. finally allowed perfins in 1908.

In Britain unused postage stamps could be redeemed for cash at the post office. By agreement with postal authorities, a perfin stamp on a letter could be used only by the owner of the perfin.  Therefore, a stolen perforated stamp would be of no value to the unauthorized bearer.  Thus the use of perfins gave organizations better security over their postage. The demise of the perfin came about by the widespread use of postage meter machines which obviated the need for perfins.

Officially prepared perfins
A number of countries have perforated stamps to denote official mail. Denmark punctured stamps for use by the Danish Home Guard. The United States has punctured stamps for use by various Federal organisations and Australian states such as Victoria and Queensland used perfins widely on their stamps.

Collecting perfins
Formerly considered damaged and not worth collecting, perforated postage stamps are now highly sought after by specialist collectors. It is often difficult to identify the originating uses of individual perfins because there are usually no identifying features; for instance the Kodak company used a simple K as their perfin, but on its own a stamp perforated K could have been used by several other users. A K perfin still affixed to a cover that has some company identifying feature, like the company name, address, or even a postmark or cancellation of a town where the company had offices, enhances such a perfin.  Note that the block of 12 stamps illustrated on the right includes two copies of the highly sought-after erroneous 5-cent denomination instead of 2 cents.

Postal stationery
In addition to stamps, postal stationery envelopes, postcards, and newspaper wrappers were perfinned.

Perfinned postal orders
Perfinned British postal orders were used to pay out winning bets on the football pools and these postal orders are very sought after by collectors.

Specimen stamps 
Specimen stamps have often been perfinned with the word specimen to denote their status.

Reply coupons 
International reply coupons have been issued by the Channel Island of Jersey in which the country is identified by the letters 'JE' perfinned into the coupon.

References

Clubs 
German Perfin Association - In German
The Perfins Club - United States based perfin society
The Perfin Society - Great Britain based perfin society

External links 

Canadian Perfin Officials
 Canadian Perfins of the Victorian Era
Hong Kong Perfins
King George V Silver Jubilee - Perfins
Scout PERFINs & SPIFS
Official Site of Italian Perfins — In Italian and English
Perfins on the Stamps of Cuba
Perfin stamps of Australia.

Philatelic terminology